Eritai (Eri), or Baburiwa, is a Lakes Plain language of Irian Jaya, Indonesia. It is named after Erai village in East Central Mambermano District, Mamberamo Raya Regency.

It is spoken in Erai, Haya, and Kustera villages.

Sikaritai, Obokuitai, and Eritai constitute a dialect cluster.

References

Central Lakes Plain languages
Languages of western New Guinea